Queijo coalho grelhado is a Brazilian specialty of coalho cheese grilled like a kebab.

See also
 List of cheese dishes

Brazilian cheeses